Yge Visser (born 29 July 1963, The Hague, Netherlands) is a Dutch chess Grandmaster (2006).

In 2004 he tied for 1st–4th with Yuriy Kuzubov, Friso Nijboer and John van der Wiel in the Harmonie Invitational in Groningen.

References

External links

1963 births
Living people
People from Sneek
Chess grandmasters
Dutch chess players
Sportspeople from Friesland